Nizhyn Raion  is a raion (district) of Chernihiv Oblast, northern Ukraine. Its administrative centre is located at Nizhyn. Population: 

On 18 July 2020, as part of the administrative reform of Ukraine, the number of raions of Chernihiv Oblast was reduced to five, and the area of Nizhyn Raion was significantly expanded. Four abolished raions, Bakhmach, Bobrovytsia, Borzna, and Nosivka Raions, as well as the city of Nizhyn, which was previously incorporated as a city of oblast significance and did not belong to the raion, were merged into Nizhyn Raion. The January 2020 estimate of the raion population was

Subdivisions

Current
After the reform in July 2020, the raion consisted of 17 hromadas:
 Bakhmach urban hromada with the administration in the city of Bakhmach, transferred from Bakhmach Raion;
 Baturyn urban hromada with the administration in the city of Baturyn, transferred from Bakhmach Raion;
 Bobrovytsia urban hromada with the administration in the city of Bobrovytsia, transferred from Bobrovytsia Raion;
 Borzna urban hromada with the administration in the city of Borzna, transferred from Borzna Raion;
 Dmytrivka settlement hromada with the administration in the urban-type settlement of Dmytrivka, transferred from Bakhmach Raion;
 Komarivka rural hromada with the administration in the selo of Komarivka, transferred from Borzna Raion;
 Kruty rural hromada with the administration in the selo of Kruty, retained from Nizhyn Raion;
 Losynivka settlement hromada with the administration in the urban-type settlement of Losynivka, retained from Nizhyn Raion;
 Makiivka rural hromada with the administration in the selo of Makiivka, transferred from Nosivka Raion;
 Mryn rural hromada with the administration in the selo of Mryn, transferred from Nosivka Raion;
 Nizhyn urban hromada with the administration in the city of Nizhyn, was previously a city of oblast significance;
 Nosivka urban hromada with the administration in the city of Nosivka, transferred from Nosivka Raion;
 Nova Basan rural hromada with the administration in the selo of Nova Basan, transferred from Bobrovytsia Raion;
 Plysky rural hromada with the administration in the selo of Plysky, transferred from Borzna Raion;
 Talalaivka rural hromada with the administration in the selo of Talalaivka, retained from Nizhyn Raion;
 Vertiivka rural hromada with the administration in the selo of Vertiivka, retained from Nizhyn Raion;
 Vysoke rural hromada with the administration in the selo of Vysoke, transferred from Borzna Raion.

Before 2020

Before the 2020 reform, the raion consisted of four hromadas:
 Kruty rural hromada with the administration in Kruty;
 Losynivka settlement hromada with the administration in Losynivka;
 Talalaivka rural hromada with the administration in Talalaivka;
 Vertiivka rural hromada with the administration in Vertiivka.

References

Raions of Chernihiv Oblast
1923 establishments in Ukraine